The Jam Museum is a gastronomic museum opened in 2004 in Torrent, in the Baix Empordà region of Spain. Its creator is Georgina Regàs, also author of the book 70 confitures.

Description 
In its workshop, jams and jellies are made from over 114 flavors. The museum is a space created to discover all the secrets that are hidden in a jar of jam. There are confitures for all tastes: from exotic or traditional fruits, sweet or bitter, classic or unknown, etc. Adult courses and workshop for children from 6 to 12 years old are organized, and they have a specialized library and a collection of confitures from different countries.

Awards and recognitions 
 2010: gold medal for cumquat jam
 2011: bronze medal for bitter orange jam
 2012: silver medal for lemon jam; silver medal for orange marmalade with Grand Marnier; bronze medal for bitter orange jam and chocolate
 2013: bronze medal for bitter orange jam
 2014: gold medal: bitter orange jelly; silver medal: bitter orange jam; bronze medal: orange orange jam; bronze medal: orange marmalade with rosemary and black pepper from Rimbas
 2015: gold medal for bitter orange jam; bronze medal for grapefruit jam and Beefeater
 2016: silver medal for bitter orange jam (silver cut); silver medal for orange marmalade with citrus caviar
Apart from the medals awarded by the Dalmatian Marmalade Festival for citrus jams, the Museum has received other awards and recognitions:
 2009: Gourmand Prize for the first edition in Spanish of the book "70 confitures"
 2012: Timó d'Argent Award to Georgina Regàs awarded by the Unió d'Empresaris d'Hostaleria i Turisme de la Costa Brava
 2013: Third Prize Germán Arrien to Georgina Regàs
 2013: Gourmand Prize for the best illustrated Spanish cookbook in 2012 for the book "Els Secrets de les Confitures", written jointly by Georgina Regàs and Pere Castells
 2015: Mercader Award to Georgina Regàs awarded by the Gastronomic Forum of Girona
 2016: Girona Quality Seal Excellent for tomato preserves, Mas Marcè sheep cheese and oregano flower in the category Almívars i Conserves - Specialties Singulars

References

External links 
 Official webpage of The Jam Museum
 Baix Empordà Tourism - Museums

Museums in Baix Empordà